The 2007 Nebelhorn Trophy is took place between September 27 and 30, 2007 at the Eislaufzentrum Oberstdorf. The competition is an international senior-level figure skating competition organized by the Deutsche Eislauf-Union and held annually in Oberstdorf, Germany. It is named after the Nebelhorn, a nearby mountain.

It is one of the first international senior competition of the season. Skaters are entered by their respective national federations and compete in four disciplines: men's singles, ladies' singles, pair skating, and ice dance. The Fritz-Geiger-Memorial Trophy is presented to the team with the highest placements across all disciplines. In 2007, the US won, Germany was second, and Czech Republic was third.

The Nebelhorn Trophy is often used as a testing ground for new changes in skating regulation. In 2007, a compulsory dance test occurred. Three compulsories were performed and each team was drawn to perform a specific dance. The dances were the Austrian Waltz, Yankee Polka, and the Argentine Tango.

Results

Men

Ladies

Pairs

Ice dance

Compulsory dances by team

External links

 2007 Nebelhorn Trophy
 Nebelhorn-Trophy 2007

Nebelhorn Trophy, 2007
Nebelhorn Trophy
2007 in German sport